Luís Tinoco may refer to:
Luís Tinoco (composer), Portuguese composer
Luís Tinoco (footballer), Portuguese footballer